Nils Per Imerslund (9 May 1912 – 7 December 1943), born in Kristiania, Norway, was one of the most prominent figures of the Nazi scene in pre-World War II Norway. He first gained prominence at home and abroad with the publication in 1936 of his début book, Das Land Noruega, a fictionalised autobiography of his youth in Mexico. His blonde, blue-eyed stature and extravagant way of life gave him the position of "the Aryan Idol". A loathing of his homosexuality and self-perceived feminine traits, led him to frequently risk his life. He lived most of his early years in Mexico and Germany, fought with the Sturmabteilung (SA) in Berlin in the 1930s, fought with the Fascist Falange in the Spanish Civil War, and finally joined the Waffen SS to fight in Ukraine and Finland, where he was severely injured. He died at Aker University Hospital on 7 December 1943. Imerslund also participated in radio broadcasts in the Nazi-controlled Norwegian Broadcasting Corporation.

Selected works

References

External links
Aftenposten (In Norwegian)

Relevant publications
Emberland, Terje, and Bernt Rougthvedt. Det ariske idol: Forfatteren, eventyreren og nazisten Per Imerslund. Aschehoug, 2004.
Montfort, Ricardo Pérez. "Three Norwegian Experiences in Post-Revolutionary Mexico: Per Imerslund, Halfdan Jebe and Ola Apenes." In Expectations Unfulfilled: Norwegian Migrants in Latin America, 1820-1940, pp. 184–224. Brill, 2016.
Neyens, Mieke. "Revisiting the revolution: a Norwegian Nazi in 1930s Mexico." Studies in Travel Writing 19, no. 4 (2015): 358-376.

1912 births
1943 deaths
Hamar Katedralskole alumni
Norwegian expatriates in Mexico
Norwegian expatriates in Germany
Norwegian people of the Spanish Civil War
Nazis from outside Germany
Norwegian modern pagans
Members of Nasjonal Samling
Norwegian gay writers
Norwegian autobiographers
LGBT people in the Nazi Party
German gay writers
Waffen-SS personnel killed in action
Foreign volunteers in the Spanish Civil War
Norwegian Waffen-SS personnel
20th-century Norwegian writers
Norwegian anti-communists